Thierry Blondeau (born 1961) is a French composer.

Life 
Born in Vincennes, Blondeau studied music and literature in Paris and Berlin (First Prize for musical composition at the Conservatoire de Paris and the Hochschule der Künste).

In 2002 and 2003, he was a guest composer in Berlin at the invitation of the German Academic Exchange Service.

Blondeau's music can be seen as an audible construction of acoustic, spatial and instrumental conditions. The awareness of a lively sound leads him to integrate as much as possible the space of performance as an extended sound body of the instrument into the composition. This preoccupation led him, in addition to the concert pieces, to conceive sound actions in relation to a place, a space or a situation. Since 2000 he has been writing educational instrumental pieces with electroacoustics for all ages in collaboration with various music schools, with the aim of making contemporary music accessible to beginners.

His works are published by Éditions Jobert, Paris, and Dahlmann, Strasbourg.

Selected works 
1992: Ups and Downs, for 5 instruments
1993: Zigzag, for 14 instruments and electronics
1999: Pêle-Mêle, for 10 instruments and electronics
2002: Étude au Doppler, for 2 instruments and 2 Loudspeakers
2005: Lieu, for 10 instruments
2006: Appel, Écho, Envol, for 3 choirs, 4 solo flutes and orchestra
2011: String Quartet No. 1

References

External links 
 
 , Ensemble Cairn

1961 births
Living people
20th-century French composers
20th-century French male musicians
21st-century French composers
21st-century French male musicians
Conservatoire de Paris alumni
French male composers
People from Vincennes